Carmen Lucia may refer to:
 Carmen Lúcia (justice) (born 1954), Brazilian justice in the Supreme Federal Court
 Carmen Lucia (union organizer) (1902–1985), Italian-American union organizer